Kaiser is a West German strategy video game developed and published by Ariolasoft. In 2003 Kaiser II author Carsten Strotmann released the source code under the GNU General Public Licence.

References

Weblinks
 IMDb entry
 giantbomb Game Wiki entry
 lemon64 game entry
 GameFAQs entry
 German podcast episode about the game

1984 video games
Amstrad CPC games
Ariolasoft games
Atari 8-bit family games
Commodore 64 games
Simulation video games
Strategy video games
Video games developed in Germany